Marcondes is both a surname and a given name. Notable people with the name include:

Emiliano Marcondes (born 1995), Danish footballer
Igor Marcondes (born 1997), Brazilian tennis player
Matheus Marcondes (1903–?), Brazilian long-distance runner
Marcondes Alves de Sousa (1868–1938), Brazilian politician